49-O is a 2015 Tamil political satire film directed by debutante P. Arokiyadoss, who previously worked as an assistant to Gautham Vasudev Menon. It stars legendary actor Goundamani in the lead role, while actors Thirumurugan, Guru Somasundaram, and Balasingh, among others, play supporting roles. Production began in December 2013. The film released on 17 September 2015 on Vinayagar Chaturthi along with Maya and Trisha Illana Nayanthara and received mixed to positive reviews from critics.

Synopsis
The story portrays how politicians grab agricultural lands to real estate land mafia. It also explains the importance of a special voting option of NOTA.

Cast
Goundamani as Sowri
Thirumurugan as Karikalan
Guru Somasundaram as Broker Arumugam
Balasingh as Dheenadhyalan 
Rajendran as Advertisement Director 
V. I. S. Jayapalan as MLA Boominathan
Chaams as Chaams 
Ritusen as Ritusen 
Delna Davis
Munnar Ramesh

Soundtrack
The soundtrack was composed by K with the lyrics written by Yugabharathi.

Critical reception
Silverscreen noted that "Thematically similar to Kaththi, this film will go down as another laudable attempt at taking on social corruption, and trying to empower the downtrodden". Behindwoods rated it 2.25 out of 5 and noted that "The film doesn't offer anything unique within this genre but when Gounder is the face of such political attacks and mild preaching, it can get enjoyable!" New Indian Express stated that "The film is a fairly delightful take on the avariciousness of humans, the unscrupulousness of corporates and politicians, and the gullibility of the downtrodden, who are easily taken for a ride by unscrupulous elements. 49-0 could definitely have done with some polish and finesse. But substance over form is far better than gloss and style over a very weak content". Times of India rated 2 out of 5 and wrote "In the end, 49-O ends up as ineffective as the rule it criticizes — you can admire the intention and you can really take it seriously".

References

External links
 
 Official Trailer

2015 films
2010s Tamil-language films
Films scored by K (composer)